SS Westralia was a  cargo and passenger ship. She served as a troopship in the First World War and was later converted into a hulk. She was sunk in the air raids on Rabaul on 20 January 1942.

Sir J Laing & Sons, Sunderland, built her in 1897 for the Melbourne-based Huddart Parker line. She worked along the Australian coast and the trans-Tasman route.

In 1917, she was used a troopship, transporting the New Zealand 27th and 28th Main Regiment. She then resumed commercial service with Huddart Parker.

W. R. Carpenter and Company of Sydney bought her in 1927, had her engines removed and towed her to Rabaul for use as coal hulk, arriving in 1929. In the Rabaul air raids on 20 January 1942 she was bombed and sunk in Simpson Harbour.

Citiations

References

1896 ships
Coal hulks
Iron and steel steamships of Australia
Maritime incidents in January 1942
Passenger ships of Australia
Shipwrecks of Papua New Guinea
Ships sunk by Japanese aircraft
Troop ships of Australia
Ships built on the River Wear
World War I passenger ships
World War II shipwrecks in the Pacific Ocean